Bahía Honda is a corregimiento in Macaracas District, Los Santos Province, Panama with a population of 646 as of 2010. Its population as of 1990 was 648; its population as of 2000 was 616.

References

Corregimientos of Los Santos Province